Nothogenes is a genus of moths belonging to the family Tineidae.

Species
Nothogenes citrocrana Meyrick, 1932
Nothogenes oxystoma Meyrick, 1938

References

Tineidae
Tineidae genera
Taxa named by Edward Meyrick